James West Stack (27 March 1835 – 13 October 1919) was a New Zealand missionary, clergyman, writer and interpreter. He was born in Puriri, Thames/Coromandel, New Zealand, in 1835.

His father, James Stack, had been a Wesleyan missionary at Whangaroa, who later joined the Church Mission Society (CMS), which followed the Anglican traditions. James Stack was sent to the CMS mission in Puriri, where his son was born.

He started at the boys college of St. John Evangelist, Auckland in 1846; then he attended Sydney College (later Sydney Grammar School) from 1847. From 1851 to 1852 he attended Highbury College, London. From 1853 to 1860 he was a teacher at the CMS school at Kohanga Mission of the Rev. Robert Maunsell at the Port Waikato.

He was ordained a deacon on 23 December 1860 at Holy Trinity Church, Lyttelton, and he was appointed to the Diocese of Christchurch at the Tuahiwi mission among the Māori in Canterbury. In 1861, Stack married botanist Elizabeth Jones in Auckland.

He was ordained a priest on 21 December 1862 at Church of St Michael and All Angels, Christchurch. From 1864 to 1879 he worked at the Māori mission at Kaiapoi. From 1880 to 1898 he was appointed to various churches in the Banks Peninsula and Christchurch districts. On 11 September 1894 he was appointed as canon of Christchurch Cathedral.

In 1898 he retired and went to live with his brother-in-law in Bordighera, Liguria, Italy. From 1907 until his death in 1919 he lived at Worthing, England.

Publications
The following books were written by James West Stack. Some were published posthumously and most are still available in various formats. Some have been later re-published under slightly different titles.

 South Island Maoris (1893)
 Kaiapohia. The Story of a Siege (1893)
 Tales of Banks Peninsula (Contributor),(1884)
 Koro, A Maori Churchworker (1909)
 Through Canterbury and Otago With Bishop Harper 1859–1860 (1909)
 A White Boy Among Maoris (1934) (autobiography)
 Early Maoriland Adventures (1935)
 More Maoriland Adventures (c1936)
 Further Maoriland Adventures (1937)
 Family Life in New Zealand 1840–1850 (1969)
 Letters to my Grandchildren; About my Childhood in New Zealand 1835–1846

Notelist

References

1835 births
1919 deaths
19th-century New Zealand Anglican priests
Interpreters
People from Coromandel Peninsula
19th-century translators
New Zealand Anglican missionaries
Anglican missionaries in New Zealand
Missionary linguists